The New Cool is an album by the Australian rock band Daddy Cool.

The New Cool also refers to:

The New Cool (Bob James and Nathan East album)
The New Cool (book) by Neal Bascomb

See also
New Cool Collective, a Dutch musical ensemble